Peter Francis Beard (born 22 May 1935) is a former Australian politician. He was a Member of the Queensland Legislative Assembly.

Early life 
Beard was born in Mount Isa to Francis James Beard and Phyllis Mabel, née Fisher. He attended All Souls' School in Charters Towers before studying for a Bachelor of Arts at the University of Queensland. He then worked as a primary and secondary school teacher, and also as a personnel officer at Mount Isa Mines Ltd, where he had worked as a labourer after high school. He was chairman of the Mount Isa Mines Employees Health Society and secretary of the local branch of the Queensland Teachers Union.

Politics 
A member of the Liberal Party, Beard was elected to the Queensland Legislative Assembly as the member for Mount Isa in 1986, rising to become deputy leader of the party in 1988, but he lost his seat in 1989.

References

1935 births
Living people
Liberal Party of Australia members of the Parliament of Queensland
Members of the Queensland Legislative Assembly